Mount Walcott is a mainly ice-free mountain (2,155 m) located 2.5 nautical miles (4.6 km) east of Mount Powell in the east part of the Thiel Mountains. The name was proposed by Peter Bermel and Arthur Ford, co-leaders of the United States Geological Survey (USGS) Thiel Mountains party which surveyed these mountains in 1960–61. It was named for Charles D. Walcott, the third director of the U.S. Geological Survey from 1894 to 1907.

Mountains of Ellsworth Land